Scribbled in Chalk is the second studio album by Scottish folk musician Karine Polwart, released on 7 March 2006.

The album was shortlisted for Best Album at the Scots Trad Music Awards, and the track "Daisy" won Best Original Song at the BBC Radio 2 Folk Awards.

Track listing
All songs by Karine Polwart.

"Hole in the Heart" – 4:48 
"I'm Gonna Do It All" – 4:56 
"Daisy" – 3:27
"Maybe There's a Road" – 4:17 
"Where the Smoke Blows" – 3:16 
"Holy Moses" – 4:30 
"Don't Know Why" – 4:39 
"Take Its Own Time" – 3:45 
"I've Seen It All" – 3:22
"Baleerie Baloo" – 3:27 
"Terminal Star" – 4:38 
"Follow the Heron" – 3:11

"Daisy" and "I'm Gonna Do It All" were also released as CD singles. A music video was made for the latter in which the song was lip-synched by a 9-year-old girl, the daughter of former Karine Polwart Band member Dean Owens. The "Daisy" single included acoustic versions of "Where the Smoke Blows" and "Terminal Star" as bonus tracks; "I'm Gonna Do It All" included the video and a non-album track, "John C. Clark (The Gasman Song)".

Karine Polwart albums
2006 albums